Indianola is an unincorporated community in Sanpete County, Utah, United States, east of U.S. Route 89 at Thistle Creek and  northeast of Fairview. An early Native American village existed here, and in pioneer times the site was selected for a Native American reservation.

The town of Indianola was settled in 1871.

Climate
This climatic region is typified by large seasonal temperature differences, with warm to hot (and often humid) summers and cold (sometimes severely cold) winters.  According to the Köppen Climate Classification system, Indianola has a humid continental climate, abbreviated "Dfb" on climate maps.

References

Unincorporated communities in Sanpete County, Utah
Unincorporated communities in Utah
Populated places established in 1871
1871 establishments in Utah Territory